Tall Pony was a band consisting of Paul Towey and Tony Gage from Cheltenham and Gloucester.

Their song "I'm Your Boyfriend Now" was played first by BBC Radio 1's Huw Stephens at the end of October 2006. The track became the year's most requested song on his show - and subsequently was voted number 1 in the inaugural Dandelion Radio Festive Fifty for 2006. In August 2007 the band split up.

References

External links
 'I'm your boyfriend now' live at the BBC Maida Vale studios 06/12/2006
 Tall Pony's MySpace page
 Tall Pony's youtube channel
 Tall Pony's facebook page

British pop music groups
Musical groups established in 2006
Musical groups disestablished in 2007